William Stanford Heatly, Jr. (September 3, 1912 – February 25, 1984) was a Democratic member of the Texas House of Representatives who served from 1955 to 1983. Known as the "Duke of Paducah", a reference to his hometown of Paducah, the county seat of Cottle County, Heatly wielded significant political power during his tenure in office.

Political career 

First elected to the Texas House in 1954, Heatly had only four opponents during his subsequent twenty-eight years as representative of District 82 and then the nine-county District 80, which was reorganized in 1973 into the 15-county District 101. Heatly became a member of the House Appropriations Committee; in 1959, he was elevated to the chairmanship during the second term of Governor Price Daniel. In that position Heatly became one of the most influential and controversial figures in the legislature, and he seldom concealed the joy with which he wielded his power. He was credited with procuring increased funding in the state's mental-health programs, the prison system, programs for troubled and wayward youth, and cancer research and treatment. He also made several enemies because of his reluctance to spend state funds on what he considered "superfluous" programs and his generosity to favored institutions and agencies.

Often Heatly was accused of using the appropriations bill to induce fellow legislators to vote his way. Many colleagues complained about his ruthless, domineering behavior, which included calling up influential people in their districts to put political pressure on them. Heatly, however, defended the practice by declaring that there was nothing wrong with "practical politics" and recommending that legislators be influenced by hometown voters instead of Austin lobbyists. Governor Preston Smith endorsed Heatly, and he obtained several state-funded projects for his district.

His twenty-four-year tenure on the appropriations committee and the twelve he served as chairman both set records unmatched for at least another decade. Frustrated by the Legislative Redistricting Board's 1980 plan for West Texas counties, Heatly retired from politics in 1982 and returned to Paducah to "take some time to spoil his nine grandchildren."

He was succeeded by the Republican Anita Dorcas Hill (1928–2003) of Garland in Dallas County, in a renumbered and fully reconstituted district.

Heatly was a thirty-third-degree Mason. He was also a past president of the Paducah Lions International and an elder in the Paducah First Christian Church. On February 25, 1984, he died in his sleep at his home from an apparent heart attack. He is interred at Garden of Memories Cemetery in Paducah.

Legacy 
Heatly's son, Gene Heatly, served as 46th Judicial District attorney from 1977 to 1988. Another son, William H. "Bill" Heatly, also a Democrat, is the 50th Judicial District judge, having been elected in 2004.

Heatly's grandson, J. Staley Heatly, was elected 46th Judicial District attorney in November 2006.

The Brown-Heatly Building in Austin, which houses the Texas Health and Human Services Commission, is partly named for Heatly.

References 

[The Handbook of Texas Online]http://www.tshaonline.org/handbook/online/articles/fhe45

BIBLIOGRAPHY: 
The Handbook of Texas Online;
Amarillo Sunday News-Globe, February 26, 1983. *Dallas Morning News, March 28, 1983.
Lubbock Avalanche-Journal, February 26, 1984. Vertical File, Southwest Collection, Texas Tech University.

1912 births
1984 deaths
Democratic Party members of the Texas House of Representatives
People from Paducah, Texas
20th-century American politicians